Socorro Santiago is an American actress who has made occasional appearances in Law & Order and a recurring role on All My Children as Isabella Santos from 1993 to 2004.

Santiago was born in New York City to a Puerto Rican mother and Mexican father and attended Juilliard. Initially she began her career as a dancer in dance troupe before moving into acting. She made her acting debut in the 1977 Off-Broadway play Crack and her Broadway debut in the 1980 play The Bacchae.

Awards
 1998 ALMA Award nomination Outstanding Actress in a Daytime Soap Opera for All My Children
 1999 ALMA Award winner Outstanding Actress in a Daytime Soap Opera for All My Children
 2008 IRNE Awards nomination Best Actress (Drama) for Boleros for the Disenchanted

Filmography

Film
 Raw Deal (1986) - Nurse at Center
 A Shock to the System (1990) - Rental Car Attendant, Additional Dialogue
 Heaven's Prisoners (1996) - Spanish Nun
 Night Falls on Manhattan (1996) - Lab Assistant
 The Associate (1996) - Syntonex Worker
 Hurricane Streets (1997) - Gloria
 The Devil's Advocate (1997) - Nurse #1
 Happiness (1998) - Crying Teacher
 Lulu on the Bridge (1998) - Paramedic #1
 Music of the Heart (1999) - Lucy's Mother
 Virgin (2003) - Lorna
 Breaking Point (2009) - Nurse Rawlings
 All Good Things (2010) - Nurse
 Butterflies of Bill Baker (2013) - Nerse Bertha
 Gabriel (2014) - Rosa
 An Ornament of Faith (2017) - Mother
 Widows (2018) - Lita
 Vampires vs. the Bronx (2020) - Tía Maria

Television
 The Cosby Mysteries (1994) - Doris Montero
 New York News (1995) - Mary Ann
 Third Watch (1999–2000) - Mrs. Caffey
 "History of the World" (1999)
 "Alone in a Crowd" (2000)
 "This Band of Brothers" (2000)
 All My Children (1993–2004) - Isabella Santos
 Law & Order (1991–2005)
 "God Bless the Child" (1991) - Cora Amado
 "Cruel and Unusual" (1995) - Clarice Reynolds
 "Working Mom" (1997) - Teresa Regalado
 "Punk" (1998) - Alma Cabrera
 "White Lie" (2001) - Teresa Martinez
 "Sheltered" (2003) - Anna Rodriguez
 "Life Line" (2005) - Estela Richter
 Law & Order: Criminal Intent (2005)
 "Ex Statis" (2005) - Mrs. Raphael
 Law & Order: Special Victims Unit (2011-2014)
 "Personal Fouls" (2011) - Domenica Ramos
 "Funny Valentine" (2013) - Judge P. Ortiz
 "Traumatic Wounds" (2013) - Judge P. Ortiz
 "Downloaded Child" (2014) - Judge P. Ortiz

Voice acting
 Frontline (1999)
 Smuggler's Run (2000) - Conchita Gonzalez
 Dora the Explorer (2004–2006) - Mami, Tía
 True Crime: New York City (2005) - Teresa

References

External links
 

American film actresses
Actresses from New York City
American television actresses
Living people
American stage actresses
American voice actresses
Hispanic and Latino American actresses
Year of birth missing (living people)
21st-century American women